MusicfestNW (MFNW) was a multi-venue music festival that took place every fall in Portland, Oregon from 2001 to 2018. In 2014 the format of the festival changed to a two-day waterfront music festival. The festival was organized by the alternative weekly Willamette Week. Its sister festival, TechfestNW (TFNW), ran from 2012 to 2021.

History 
In 1995, the creators of the South by Southwest festival partnered with the Willamette Week to create the North by Northwest Music Festival. In 2001, Willamette Week ended their sponsorship of NXNW, and started MusicfestNW in its place.

At its height, MFNW was the third largest indoor music festival in the United States, with more than 150 bands across 18 of Portland's most popular music venues. The main festival stages included the Crystal Ballroom, Roseland Theater and Doug Fir.

In 2009, MFNW was rated by Time as one of 50 Authentic American Experiences of 2009.

References

External links 
 MusicfestNW website
 CNN Fortune Tech May Have Found Its Next SXSW
 Brooklyn Vegan MFNW 2011 Day 4
 Oregon Live MFNW Overview 2011

Festivals in Portland, Oregon
Music festivals in Oregon
2001 establishments in Oregon
Music festivals established in 2001
Annual events in Portland, Oregon